Solemya occidentalis , the West Indian awning clam, is a species of marine bivalve mollusc in the family Solemyidae. This species is found in the western Atlantic Ocean from Florida to the West Indies.

References

Solemyidae
Bivalves of New Zealand
Bivalves described in 1857